B series may refer to:

 B series, a term in philosophy introduced by John McTaggart
 B-series, a type of power series in numerical analysis introduced by John C. Butcher
 BMC B-series engine, a type of combustion engine
 Chevrolet/GMC B series, a bus
 Series B, venture capital funding round
 Series B banknotes, Irish banknotes
 Transperth B-series train, a type of electric multiple unit used by Transperth Trains in Perth, Western Australia

See also
 B class (disambiguation)
 A series (disambiguation)
 C series (disambiguation)